In the Beginning is the second live album by Stevie (Ray) Vaughan and Double Trouble (the stage name at that time did not include Vaughan's middle name). While the album was released about two years after Vaughan's death in 1990, the actual performance took place on April 1, 1980 at Steamboat 1874 in Austin, Texas, and was broadcast live on KLBJ-FM radio.  A 25-year-old Vaughan, still more than three years away from the release of his first studio album, performs with his "Double Trouble" bandmates: Chris Layton, drummer, and Jackie Newhouse, bassist. (Newhouse was replaced by bassist Tommy Shannon in January 1981, who would remain part of Double Trouble until Stevie's death.)

Critical reception 

Writing in 1993 for The Village Voice, Robert Christgau called Vaughan "unfledged" and the performance "blues as a barely controllable torrent of electric sound", while naming "Shake for Me" and "Tin Pan Alley" as highlights. He later assigned In the Beginning a three-star honorable mention grade, indicating "an enjoyable effort consumers attuned to its overriding aesthetic or individual vision may well treasure". AllMusic's Cub Koda gave it two out of five stars and recommended the album to Vaughan fans. He said it showcased the guitarist's signature sound, "albeit still in need of some polishing", while highlighting the songs "In the Open" and "Tin Pan Alley".

Track listing
 "In the Open" (Sonny Thompson, Freddie King) – 5:57
 "Slide Thing" (Stevie Ray Vaughan) – 3:18
 "They Call Me Guitar Hurricane" (Eddie Jones (Guitar Slim)) – 3:06
 "All Your Love (I Miss Loving)" (Otis Rush) – 6:23
 "Tin Pan Alley (aka Roughest Place in Town)" (Robert Geddins) – 7:40
 "Love Struck Baby" (Stevie Ray Vaughan) – 2:56
 "Tell Me" (Chester Burnett (Howlin' Wolf)) – 2:48
 "Shake for Me" (Willie Dixon) – 4:04
 "Live Another Day" (Stevie Ray Vaughan) – 3:49

References

External links 
 

Stevie Ray Vaughan live albums
1992 live albums
Epic Records live albums
Live blues albums